Jason Peak is a peak,  high, lying  west of Jason Harbour on the north coast of South Georgia. The name appears to be first used on a 1929 British Admiralty chart.

References

Mountains and hills of South Georgia